Vadym Shavrin (born 15 May 1988) is a professional Ukrainian football forward who plays for Naftovyk Okhtyrka.

Shavrin is a product of the FC Shakhtar Donetsk youth sports school. He made his debut for Shakhtar Donetsk in the Ukrainian Premier League on 17 June 2007 in a match against Metalurh Zaporizhia.

References

External links 

1988 births
Living people
Sportspeople from Makiivka
Ukrainian footballers
FC Shakhtar Donetsk players
FC Shakhtar-2 Donetsk players
FC Shakhtar-3 Donetsk players
FC Stal Alchevsk players
FC Volyn Lutsk players
FC Olimpik Donetsk players
FC Zirka Kropyvnytskyi players
FC Slavkhlib Slovyansk players
FC Poltava players
MFC Mykolaiv players
FC Helios Kharkiv players
FC Okean Kerch players
FC Polissya Zhytomyr players
FC Sumy players
FC Viktoriya Mykolaivka players
FC Naftovyk-Ukrnafta Okhtyrka players
Ukrainian Premier League players
Association football forwards